The Huntington metropolitan area may refer to:

The Huntington, West Virginia metropolitan area, United States
The Huntington, Indiana micropolitan area, United States

See also
Huntington (disambiguation)